Blackburne House is an 18th-century Grade II listed building located on the east side of Hope Street, Liverpool, Merseyside, England. It was built in 1788 and remodelled in from 1874 to 1876. Originally a private house, it became a girls' school and, after a period of dereliction, it is now used as a training and resource centre for women.

History

The house was built in 1788 for John Blackburne, at a time when this was in the countryside outside Liverpool. Blackburne  originally came from Warrington. He was a wealthy salt refiner and a supporter of the slave trade. In 1760 he had been Lord Mayor of Liverpool.

In 1844 the house was bought from Blackburne by George Holt. Holt was a cotton broker and merchant, and an abolitionist. He was also a supporter  of women's rights, and on 5 August 1844 he opened the house as Blackburne House Girls' School with a Latin motto which translates as: "Born not for ourselves alone but for the whole of the world."  Blackburne House was the first school for girls in Liverpool, and was sited directly opposite the Mechanic's Institution, a school for boys on the other side of Hope Street.  Holt was the director and president of the school until he died in 1861, when the school was taken over by the Mechanic's Institute.  
The building was extended in 1874–76 by W. I. Mason, who added a wing to the north and a central tower.

In 1905 it came under the management of Liverpool City Council, and continued as a school until it closed in 1986.

Current use

The building lay empty until 1994 when the Women's Technology and Education Centre commissioned its conversion into a training and resource centre.

Architecture

Blackburne  House is constructed in brick with stone dressings and a slate roof. It has two storeys, a basement and an attic. Its  Hope Street front has seven bays. The central bay projects forward and is surmounted by a domical roof with a clock face and an iron railing on its crest. The ground floor contains a rusticated round-headed entrance  flanked by paired columns supporting an entablature and a pierced balcony. In the first floor is a three-light window with a tympanum, and rusticated quoins. In the attic floor are three round-headed windows, flat pilasters and a segmental pediment. The second and sixth bays consist of two-storeyed canted bays containing  sash windows with architraves. In the attics are two round-headed windows. The other bays have three-light windows with pilasters and tympani containing carvings of foliage and busts in the ground floor. The windows in the first floor of these bays are surrounded by pilasters, entablatures and pediments. On the right side of the building is the  entrance to the original house. It has four bays and includes a portico with four Ionic columns. On 14 March 1975 the beautiful house was designated it as a Grade II  listed building.

References

External links
Blackburne House Group

Education in Liverpool
History of Liverpool
Grade II listed buildings in Liverpool
Defunct schools in Liverpool
Grade II listed houses
1844 establishments in England
1986 disestablishments in England
Girls' schools in Merseyside
Holt family
Hope Street, Liverpool